Sachal Sarmast or Sacho Sarmast ( (1739–1827), born Abdul Wahab Farooqi was a prominent and a legendary Sindhi Sufi poet from Sindh (Mehran) in modern-day Pakistan.

Biography 

Sachal Sarmast wrote poetry in seven languages: Sindhi, Siraiki, Persian, Urdu, Balochi, Punjabi and Arabic. He lived during the Kalhoro/Talpur era. He was born in 1152 H. (A.D. 1739) in Daraza, near Ranipur. He was a Sunni Sufi Muslim and contributed a lot to Sindhi Poetry too. His descent is claimed to be from the second Caliph of Sunni Islam, Umar. His book like Shah jo Risalo is fittingly called Sache jo Risalo "The Message of the Truthful".

Urs of Sachal 
An annual three-day urs, or festival commemorating the death anniversary of Sachal Sarmast is held at Daraza Sharif, beginning on the 13th day of Ramazan, including a literary conference and musical concerts based on his poetry.

References

 "The Rise, Growth And Decline of Indo-Persian Literature" by R M Chopra, 2nd Edition 2013, published by Iran Culture House, New Delhi and Iran Society, Kolkata.

External links

 Sachal Jo Sindhi Kalam: Sachal jo Risalo published online by Abdul-Majid Bhurgri
 Agha Sufi, Sachal Sarmast (vol. 1: Chapters I-III), pub. Shikarpur Sindh, 1933.   
 Agha Sufi, Sachal Sarmast (vol. 2: Chapters IV-V, glossary), pub. Shikarpur Sindh, 1933.  
 Sachal Jo Sindhi Kalam: Sachal jo Risalo in downloadable PDF eBook format
 Songs of Sachal, sung in traditional style

Mystic poets
Sufi mystics
People from Khairpur District
Sindhi-language poets
Punjabi-language poets
Sufi poets
Sufis of Sindh
Sindhi people
1739 births
1829 deaths
Sufism in Pakistan
Sufi shrines in Pakistan